Shakhrom Todzhidinovich Sulaymonov ((), born 27 June 1997) is a Tajik professional football player who currently plays for Lokomotiv Pamir, on loan from FC Istiklol.

Career

Club
On 6 August 2017, Sulaymonov was introduced as a new signing for FC Istiklol, signing on loan from Utenis Utena until the end of the 2017 season.

On 6 March 2020, Sulaymonov joined Lokomotiv Pamir on loan for the season.

International
Sulaymonov made his senior international debut on 12 October 2018, in a 0–0 draw against Palestine.

Career statistics

Club

International

Statistics accurate as of match played 1 June 2022

Honors
Istiklol
 Tajikistan League (4): 2017, 2018 2019, 2021, 2022
 Tajikistan Cup (3): 2018, 2019, 2022
 Tajik Supercup (4): 2018, 2019, 2021, 2022

References

External links
 

1997 births
Living people
Tajikistani footballers
Association football midfielders
Tajikistan international footballers
Tajikistani expatriate footballers
Expatriate footballers in Russia
Expatriate footballers in Lithuania
FC Rubin Kazan players
FK Utenis Utena players
A Lyga players
FC Istiklol players
Tajikistan Higher League players